Museo Valenzuela is a museum in Valenzuela in Metro Manila, Philippines. It is the city's historical and cultural landmark, named after Pío Valenzuela in 1963. Museo Valenzuela features collections of artifacts depicting the city's past and continuing development, it also serves as a repository of the city's rich heritage and a beacon of light to its people and guests. It is likewise a venue for historical, cultural, and artistic presentations as well as seminars and symposia on national and local issues.

History
The original museum of Valenzuela was the house where Pío Valenzuela, a hero in the struggle of freedom against Spain and in whose memory the old town of Polo was renamed, was born and saw the best years of his life. This same house was burned recently.

See also
 Valenzuela, Philippines
 Pío Valenzuela

References

Images

External links

 Official website of Valenzuela City

Museums in Metro Manila
Buildings and structures in Valenzuela, Metro Manila